Johan Ernst Fredrik Føyn (28 March 1904 – 2 November 1984) was a Norwegian chemist and oceanographer. He was born in Kristiania. He was assigned professor of oceanography at the University of Oslo from 1964. His research centered on radioactivity of ocean waters, and on pollution of the oceans. He designed a method for electrolytic cleaning of sewage.

References

1904 births
1984 deaths
Scientists from Oslo
Norwegian chemists
Norwegian oceanographers
Academic staff of the University of Oslo